Eduardo Medica (born 10 February 1976) is a former professional tennis player from Argentina.

Career
Medica was coached during his career by Ruben Puerta. He won a Challenger tournament with Puerta's son, Mariano, at Cali in 1997.

The best win of his career came at the 1998 Movistar Open, in Santiago, where he defeated world number 58 Fernando Meligeni. He was eliminated in the second round by second seed Félix Mantilla. His only other second round appearance on the ATP Tour came at Casablanca in 1999.

He now coaches Gianluigi Quinzi.

Challenger titles

Singles: (1)

Doubles: (1)

References

1976 births
Living people
Argentine male tennis players
Tennis players from Buenos Aires